D B Corp Ltd., informally known as the Dainik Bhaskar Group, is India’s largest newspaper group with 66 editions published in 4 languages, read by 4.4cr readers (IRS Q4,2012) across 12 states. The major newspapers published by the group are Dainik Bhaskar (Hindi daily), Divya Bhaskar (Gujarati daily), Dainik Divya Marathi (Marathi daily), Saurashtra Samachar, DB Post (English daily) and DB Star.

The Group also publishes 3 magazines; Aha! Zindagi (a monthly family magazine in hindi), Bal Bhaskar (Hindi magazine for kids) and Young Bhaskar (English magazine for kids) are also published by the group.

Listed on the Bombay Stock Exchange, the group is majority-owned by the Bhopal-based Agarwal family.

History 
Subah Savere was launched in 1948 to fulfill the need for a Hindi language daily newspaper. It launched under the name Subah Savere in Bhopal and Good Morning India in Gwalior. In 1957, the newspaper was renamed Bhaskar Samachar.

In 1958, the newspaper was renamed Dainik Bhaskar. The word Bhaskar means "The Rising Sun" in English. Along with its rising sun graphic, was meant to represent a bright future.

Today, Dainik Bhaskar is the most-circulated daily newspaper in India.

Newspaper presence 
The Dainik Bhaskar Group's publications serve a variety of Indian states:
 Dainik Bhaskar, the Group's flagship Hindi daily, serves 11 states, offering 45 editions.
 Divya Bhaskar, a Gujarati daily, serves 2 states with 8 editions.
 Dainik Divya Marathi, a Marathi daily, serves the state of Maharashtra, offering 6 editions.
 DB Star serves 3 states with 5 editions.
 Saurashtra Samachar serves 1 state with 1 edition.
 DB Post serves 1 state with 1 edition.

Among all of its publications, the Dainik Bhaskar Group serves more than 50% of India's geographical area.  The Group has a total circulation of more than 6 million copies with 53 print locations.

Dainik Bhaskar was declared the world's fourth largest circulated daily in 2016–2017.

Business expansion 
In 1983, D B Corp Ltd. attempted to expand by launching Dainik Bhaskar, Indore edition.  This was the company's first move outside its hometown of Bhopal.  Within four years, Dainik Bhaskar had become Indore's most popular newspaper, replacing the previous favorite, Nai Duniya.  Aiming to further increase its presence in the state of Madhya Pradesh, the Group launched newspaper editions based in Raipur, Bilaspur, Ujjain, Sagar, and Ratlam.  By 1995, Dainik Bhaskar was the most popular newspaper in Madhya Pradesh, and was declared the Fastest-Growing Daily in India by the Readership Survey.

In 1996, Dainik Bhaskar's next goal was to enter Jaipur as the second-most circulated newspaper on the first day it was launched, with a target circulation of 50,000.  To achieve this lofty goal, the Group set up an in-house team of 700 employees to survey of 200,000 potential newspaper-buying households in Jaipur.  Based on survey feedback, they returned to each of the surveyed households to show them a prototype of the new Dainik Bhaskar newspaper, and to give them the option to purchase an advance subscription.  These customers were offered a subscription price of Rs.1.50 (discounted from the newsstand price of Rs. 2), in addition to a refund in case of dissatisfaction.  When Dainik Bhaskar first launched in Jaipur on 19 December 1996, it entered the market as the most-circulated newspaper, with 172,347 copies sold.  Rajasthan Patrika, which had been the most popular newspaper to that point, had a circulation of around 100,000 at that time.[2]

Using the launch strategy that made it successful in Jaipur, Dainik Bhaskar later captured all the major cities of Rajasthan, including Jodhpur, Bikaner, Kota, Udaipur, and Ajmer Sikar.  By 1999, it became the most popular urban newspaper in Rajasthan.

Next the Group targeted Chandigarh.  It launched a customer survey in January 2000, covering 220,000 households.  At that time, the English-language newspapers in Chandigarh sold six times as many copies as the Hindi newspapers, with The Tribune in the lead with a circulation of approximately 50,000 copies.  Dainik Bhaskar's survey revealed that people in Chandigarh preferred English newspapers because they were of better quality.  As a result, the Group concentrated on a well-designed newspaper that incorporated the local Chandigarh dialect in the design, mixing Hindi and English.  When the new paper debuted in Chandigarh in May 2000, it entered the market with 69,000 copies.

In June 2000, Dainik Bhaskar entered Haryana, again as the most-circulated newspaper on launch day, with 271,000 copies.

For its fourth launch outside Madhya Pradesh, DB Corp Ltd. identified Ahmedabad, Gujarat as the city with the highest potential.  It surveyed 12,00,000 households, with a team of 1050 surveyors, 64 supervisors, 16 zonal managers, and 4 divisional managers.  Nearly 40–50% of the surveyors were later absorbed in Dainik Bhaskar or Divya Bhaskar.  The team was trained to reach out to 8 lakh (800,000) households in Ahmedabad, and 4 lakh (400,000) households in adjoining districts, within 40 days.  The newspaper was launched in Ahmedabad on 23 June 2003, under the brand name Divya Bhaskar, as most-circulated newspaper with 452,000 copies sold.  Within 15 months, the Group entered two more cities of Gujarat: Surat and Vadodara.  To counter this threat, the area's leading Gujarati newspapers implemented color pages, price reductions, and several high-value customer offers.  Nevertheless, by 2009, Divya Bhaskar became the largest-circulated Gujarati daily in the area.

In 2006, Dainik Bhaskar launched its operations in Punjab with its Amritsar and Jalandhar editions.  Later, it further increased its presence in Punjab with the launch of editions in Ludhiana and Bhatinda.

In 2010, Dainik Bhaskar entered the Jharkhand market with the launch of its Ranchi, Jamshedpur, and Dhanbad editions.  Its objective was to cover and capture the entire state of Jharkhand.

The next year, after having launched Hindi, Gujarati, and English publications, the Group decided to create Dainik Divya Marathi.  Launched from Aurangabad, Maharashtra, this new publication was a Marathi-language daily, focusing on the Marathwada region, where 88% of the population speaks Marathi as its first language.  Prior to its launch, the Group surveyed 1.4 lakh (140,000) households in Aurangabad.  Dainik Divya Marathi became the most popular newspaper as soon as it launched in Aurangabad.  Later, the Group expanded its market in Maharashtra with the creation of editions based in Nasik, Jalgaon, Ahmednagar, Solapur, Akola, and Amravati.

In January 2014, Dainik Bhaskar entered the market of Bihar with the launch of its Patna edition.  Dainik Bhaskar became Patna's most popular newspaper on its first day of launch, with 170,000 copies.  In 2015, DB Corp launched editions based in the Bihari regions of Muzzafarpur, Bhagalpur, and Gaya.

Magazine division 
DB Corp's magazine publications include:

 Aha Zindagi (Live Positive magazine): A Hindi-language family magazine, published monthly
 Bal Bhaskar: A fortnightly Hindi-language magazine for school-going 7 to 12-year-old.
 Young Bhaskar: A fortnightly English-language magazine, focusing on "infotainment," that targets 7- to 12-year-old.  The DB Corp also runs a "Magazine in Education" program, and publishes a version of Young Bhaskar for school subscriptions.  Currently, more than 600 schools are members of this program. but It

Radio business 
The Group also runs 30 radio stations across 7 states of India, under the brand name 94.3 MY FM.  This is the fifth largest radio network in India.  Existing stations are based in Ahmedabad, Ajmer, Indore, Nagpur, Amritsar, Jaipur, Jabalpur, Gwalior, Chandigarh, Jodhpur, Udaipur, Kota, Bhopal, Bilaspur, Raipur, Surat, and Jalandhar.

The Group has recently been awarded with licenses for 13 more new stations.  New stations include Aurangabad, Nasik, Jalgaon, Sangli, Akola, Nanded, Ahmednagar, Solapur, Rajkot, Bikaner, Hissar, and Karnal.

DB Mobile App 
DB Corp also created DB Mobile App.  The app delivers local news from more than 800 cities.  It includes sections on Bollywood, sports, fashion, Jeevan Mantra (self-help and astrology), business, and market updates.  It also includes a "DB TV" feature for video-based news and updates.

Shopping mall 
DB Corp owns a shopping mall in Bhopal. DB City Mall was inaugurated in 2009 and currently it is one of the biggest shopping malls in Madhya Pradesh. DB City Mall abbreviated from Dainik Bhaskar City mall. It is located in MP Nagar near Professional Examination Board office, Bhopal. One other Mall also inaugurated in 14 Jan 2018 at Gwalior, front of Railway station Platform No.1

References

External links 
 Official website of D B Corp Ltd.

Companies based in Madhya Pradesh
Hindi-language mass media
Mass media in Bhopal
Newspaper companies of India
1956 establishments in Madhya Pradesh
Mass media companies established in 1956
Indian companies established in 1956
Companies listed on the Bombay Stock Exchange
Companies listed on the National Stock Exchange of India